Rea Réka Mészáros (born 14 April 1994) is a retired Hungarian handball player who most recently played for Váci NKSE and the Hungarian national team.

Achievements
Nemzeti Bajnokság I:
Winner: 2015
Finalist: 2016, 2017, 2018
Magyar Kupa:
Winner: 2017

References

1994 births
Living people
Hungarian female handball players
People from Vác
Ferencvárosi TC players (women's handball)
Sportspeople from Pest County